The 2009 ECAC Hockey Men's Ice Hockey Tournament was the 48th tournament in league history. It was played between March 6 and March 21, 2009. First Round and Quarterfinal games were played at home team campus sites, while the final four games were played at the Times Union Center in Albany, New York. By winning the tournament, Yale received the ECAC Hockey automatic bid to the 2009 NCAA Division I Men's Ice Hockey Tournament.

Format
The tournament features four rounds of play. In the first round, the fifth and twelfth, sixth and eleventh, seventh and tenth, and eighth and ninth seeds as determined by the final regular season standings play a best-of-three series, with the winner advancing to the quarterfinals. There, the first seed and lowest ranked first round winner, the second seed and second lowest ranked first round winner, the third seed and second highest ranked first round winner, and the fourth seed and highest ranked first round winner play a best-of-three series, with the winner advancing to the semifinals. In the semifinals, the highest and lowest seeds and second highest and second lowest seeds play a single-game, with the winner advancing to the championship game and the loser advancing to the third place game. The tournament champion receives an automatic bid to the 2009 NCAA Men's Division I Ice Hockey Tournament.

Regular season standings
Note: GP = Games played; W = Wins; L = Losses; T = Ties; PTS = Points; GF = Goals For; GA = Goals Against

Bracket
Teams are reseeded after the First Round and Quarterfinals

First round

(5) Harvard vs. (12) Brown

(6) Dartmouth vs. (11) Rensselaer

(7) Quinnipiac vs. (10) Colgate

(8) Union vs. (9) Clarkson

Quarterfinals

(1) Yale vs. (12) Brown

(2) Cornell vs. (11) Rensselaer

(3) Princeton vs. (8) Union

(4) St. Lawrence vs. (7) Quinnipiac

Semifinals

(1) Yale vs. (4) St. Lawrence

(2) Cornell vs. (3) Princeton

Third place

(3) Princeton vs. (4) St. Lawrence

Championship

(1) Yale vs. (2) Cornell

Tournament awards

All-Tournament Team
F Sean Backman* (Yale)
F Dan Bartlett (Princeton)
F Broc Little (Yale)
D Ryan Donald (Yale)
D Jared Seminoff (Cornell)
G Alec Richards (Yale)
* Most Outstanding Player(s)

References

External links
2009 ECAC Hockey Men's Ice Hockey Tournament

ECAC Hockey Men's Ice Hockey Tournament
Ecac Tournament